Guido Leontini (21 March 1927 – 26 April 1996) was an Italian stage, film and television actor.

Life and career 
Born in Catania into a family of actors, Leontini debuted on stage in the post-World War II era, specializing in the Luigi Pirandello's repertoire. From 1962 to 1972 he was a member of the Teatro Stabile di Catania. In films, he was mainly cast in roles of tough guys or villains.

Partial filmography

 Made in Italy (1965)
 The Valachi Papers (1972) - Tony Bender
 The Sicilian Checkmate (1972) - Vacirca
 Shadows Unseen (1972) - Turi Delogo
 The Assassin of Rome (1972) - Apicella
 Black Turin (1972) - Trotta
 The Funny Face of the Godfather (1973) - Tom Iager
 La vedova inconsolabile ringrazia quanti la consolarono (1973) - Tonnozzo Prevosti
 Crazy Joe (1974) - Angelo
 Three Tough Guys (1974) - Sgt. Sam
 Emergency Squad (1974) - Mario Berlotti aka "Cranio"
 Silence the Witness (1974) - Mancuso
 Ante Up (1974) - Spreafico
 Paolo il freddo (1974) - The husband
 Qui comincia l'avventura (1975) - Marito di Laura
 Due Magnum .38 per una città di carogne (1975) - Sergio, detto 'Er Piattola'
 Season for Assassins (1975) - Brigadeer
 La bolognese (1975) - Pietro
 Deported Women of the SS Special Section (1976) - Dobermann
 Blazing Flowers (1978) - Don Chicco
 Brothers Till We Die (1978) - Mario Di Gennaro, "Er Sogliola"
 L'educatore autorizzato (1980) - Il direttore
 The Warning (1980) - Gianfranco Puma
 The Mafia Triangle (1981) - Malvasia

References

External links 
 
 
 

1927 births
1996 deaths
20th-century Italian male actors
Italian male film actors
Italian male television actors
Italian male stage actors
Actors from Catania